Jacques Pills (born René Jacques Ducos; 7 January 1906, Tulle, France – 12 September 1970) was a French singer and actor. His impresario was Bruno Coquatrix. In 1959, Pills was the Monegasque entrant at the Eurovision Song Contest 1959 with the song "Mon ami Pierrot". The song ended last, in eleventh place and got only one point.

During the 1930s he appeared frequently alongside Georges Tabet.

Personal life
He married Lucienne Boyer in 1939 and they were divorced in 1951. On 20 September 1952, he married singer Édith Piaf. However, in 1957, this marriage also ended in divorce. He was the father of Jacqueline Boyer, who won the 1960 Eurovision contest the year after her father's participation. Upon his death, he became the first Eurovision contestant to die.

Selected filmography
 1953 – Boum sur Paris
 1949 – Une femme par jour
 1945 – Alone in the Night
 1945 – Marie la Misere
 1942 – Pension Jonas
 1936 – Toi, c'est moi
 1936 – Prends la route
 1934 – Princesse Czardas
 1933 – Mademoiselle Josette, My Woman
 1932 – A Gentleman of the Ring

References

External links
 

French male film actors
Eurovision Song Contest entrants for Monaco
Eurovision Song Contest entrants of 1959
1906 births
1970 deaths
People from Tulle
20th-century French male actors
20th-century French male singers